Cycnoderus virginiae  is a species of beetle in the family Cerambycidae. It was described by Giesbert and Chemsak in 1993.

References

Rhopalophorini
Beetles described in 1993